A constitutional referendum was held in Liberia on 3 May 1949. The changes to the 1847 constitution were approved in the Legislature in 1948, and abolished the two-term limit on presidents. The change was approved by voters.

Constitutional change
The proposed changes would be to Chapter III.

A two-thirds majority in the vote was necessary for the changes to be approved.

References

1949 referendums
1949 in Liberia
Referendums in Liberia
Constitutional referendums in Liberia
May 1949 events in Africa